Bicker may refer to

Petty arguing
Bicker, Lincolnshire
Bicker, a practice in the eating clubs at Princeton University and Mount Olive College
Bicker (family), a Dutch Golden Age family, headed by Andries Bicker
Bicker Isles, an island group in South Australia